HMS Maori was a  destroyer named after the indigenous Maori people of New Zealand. She served with the United Kingdom Mediterranean Fleet during World War II until she was bombed and sunk by German aircraft while at Malta in 1942. Her wreck was later raised and scuttled outside the Grand Harbour. The wreck is now a dive site.

Description
The Tribals were intended to counter the large destroyers being built abroad and to improve the firepower of the existing destroyer flotillas and were thus significantly larger and more heavily armed than the preceding . The destroyers were powered by two Parsons geared steam turbines, each driving one propeller shaft using steam provided by three Admiralty three-drum boilers. The ships' complement consisted of 190 officers and ratings, although the flotilla leaders carried an extra 20 officers and men consisting of the Captain (D) and his staff.

The primary armament of the Tribal-class destroyers was eight quick-firing (QF) 4.7-inch (120 mm) Mark XII guns in four superfiring twin-gun mounts, one pair each fore and aft of the superstructure, designated 'A', 'B', 'X', and 'Y' from front to rear. The mounts had a maximum elevation of 40°. For anti-aircraft (AA) defence, they carried a single quadruple mount for the  QF two-pounder Mk II "pom-pom" gun and two quadruple mounts for the 0.5-inch (12.7 mm) Mark III machine gun. Low-angle fire for the main guns was controlled by the director-control tower (DCT) on the bridge roof that fed data acquired by it and the  rangefinder on the Mk II Rangefinder/Director directly aft of the DCT to an analogue mechanical computer, the Mk I Admiralty Fire Control Clock. Anti-aircraft fire for the main guns was controlled by the Rangefinder/Director which sent data to the mechanical Fuze Keeping Clock.

The ships were fitted with a single above-water quadruple mount for  torpedoes. The Tribals were not intended as anti-submarine ships, but they were provided with ASDIC, one depth charge rack and two throwers for self-defence, although the throwers were not mounted in all ships; Twenty depth charges was the peacetime allotment, but this increased to 30 during wartime.

Wartime modifications
Heavy losses to German air attack during the Norwegian Campaign  demonstrated the ineffectiveness of the Tribals' anti-aircraft suite and the RN decided in May 1940 to replace 'X' mount with two QF  Mark XVI dual-purpose guns in a twin-gun mount. To better control the guns, the existing rangefinder/director was modified to accept a Type 285 gunnery radar as they became available. The number of depth charges was increased to 46 early in the war, and still more were added later. To increase the firing arcs of the AA guns, the rear funnel was shortened and the mainmast was reduced to a short pole mast.

Construction and career 
Authorized as one of seven Tribal-class destroyers under the 1935 Naval Estimates, Maori was the second ship of her name to serve in the Royal Navy. The ship was ordered on 10 March 1936 from Fairfield Shipbuilding and Engineering Company and was laid down on 6 July at the company's Govan shipyard. She was launched on 2 September 1937 by Mrs. W. J. Jordan, the wife of the New Zealand High Commissioner Bill Jordan. Maori was completed on 30 November 1938 and commissioned on 5 December at a cost of £340,622 which excluded weapons and communications outfits furnished by the Admiralty.

Maori joined 's division in January 1939 and joined the Mediterranean Fleet. She and the other Tribal-class destroyers did convoy escort duties, and Maori then returned to Britain in October. Until April 1940 she patrolled the North Sea and also took part in the Norwegian Campaign. In June she sailed to Iceland looking for German warships and also served briefly in the Faroe Islands.

While escorting Convoy WS-8B to the Middle East, Maori, along with the destroyers Cossack,  and  broke off on 26 May and headed towards the area where Bismarck had been reported. They found her that evening and made several torpedo attacks in the evening and into the next morning. No hits were scored but they kept her gunners from getting any sleep, making it easier for the battleships to attack her the next morning. Maori then rescued some of the survivors from Bismarck after the battleship sank.

She served with the 14th Destroyer Flotilla during the Battle of Cape Bon in December 1941. Maori, commanded by Commander R. E. Courage, RN, was attacked by German aircraft and sunk at her moorings in the Malta Grand Harbour on 12 February 1942, with the loss of one of her crew; she was raised and scuttled off Fort Saint Elmo on 15 July 1945.

Wreck

Located a few hundred metres from the shore from Valletta, HMS Maori is now a popular dive site. Much of the forward superstructure is extant, including the two front gun bases. Much marine life can be found on the wreck.

Notes

References

External links
 Recent dives associated with the Commonwealth War Graves Commission

 

1937 ships
Tribal-class destroyers (1936) of the Royal Navy
Ships built in Govan
World War II destroyers of the United Kingdom
Destroyers sunk by aircraft
World War II shipwrecks in the Mediterranean Sea
Wreck diving sites
Maritime incidents in February 1942
Shipwrecks of Malta
Underwater diving sites in Malta
History of Valletta
Maritime incidents in July 1945
Ships sunk by German aircraft